Local elections in Trinidad and Tobago were held on 2 December 2019, contesting 139 electoral districts across Trinidad's 14 municipal corporation electoral areas.

With the exception of those areas that have had boundary changes, the seats up for election were last contested in the 2016 local elections.

Both parties won control of seven of the 14 corporations with the People's National Movement (PNM) losing their minority control status in the Sangre Grande regional corporation. The PNM won 72 of the 139 electoral districts, but lost the popular vote and 11 electoral districts: Sangre Grande North West in the Sangre Grande regional corporation, Lengua/Indian Walk in the Princes Town Regional Corporation, Siparia West/Fyzabad in the Siparia Regional Corporation, Cocal/Mafeking in the Mayaro–Rio Claro Regional Corporation, Enterprise South/Longdenville North in the Chaguanas Borough Corporation, Caura/Paradise/Tacarigua in the Tunapuna–Piarco Regional Corporation, Les Effort West/La Romaine, Marabella West and Marabella West/Vistabella in the San Fernando City Corporation while gaining two from the United National Congress, in the San Juan–Laventille Regional Corporation, San Juan East and Barataria. The UNC also won the newly created districts of El Socorro/Aranguez North and La Fortune/Debe North, in the San Juan–Laventille and Penal–Debe Regional Corporation.

Seats held prior to the election

The major political parties were defending the following numbers of electoral districts from municipal corporations on election day:

People's National Movement (PNM) – 83 electoral districts from 8 municipal corporations
United National Congress (UNC) – 54 electoral districts from 6 municipal corporations

These numbers are how many seats each party had won at the previous election, in 2016, rather than which party held the seat on the eve of the election.

Eligibility to vote
All registered electors (Trinidadians and Tobagonians, Commonwealth and Non-Commonwealth citizens) who will be aged 18 or over, resided legally in Trinidad and Tobago and have resided in an electoral district/constituency for a least two months prior to the election date are entitled to vote in the local elections.

Parties and standings
Political parties registered with the Elections and Boundaries Commission can contest the local elections.
The following registered parties contested the local elections:

Campaign slogans

Opinion polls
The North American Caribbean Teachers Association (NACTA) commissioned opinion polling for the next general election regularly sampling the electorates' opinions.

Municipal Corporation projections

Summary results 
Elections were conducted under the first-past-the-post system.

Results by municipal corporation electoral area

Allocation of Aldermen

Results by party

See also
2020 Trinidad and Tobago general election

References

Local elections in Trinidad and Tobago
local elections